Christian Aid is the relief and development agency of 41 Christian (Protestant, Catholic and Orthodox) churches in the UK and Ireland, and works to support sustainable development, eradicate poverty, support civil society and provide disaster relief in South America, the Caribbean, Africa and Asia.

It works with hundreds of local partner organisations in some of the world's most vulnerable communities in 24 countries.  It is a founder member of the Disasters Emergency Committee, and a major member of The Climate Coalition, The Fairtrade Foundation and Trade Justice Movement campaigns.  Christian Aid's headquarters are in London and it has regional teams across the UK and Ireland, plus country offices elsewhere around the world.  Christian Aid also organises the UK's largest door-to-door collection, Christian Aid Week, which takes place in May each year.

Its director was Loretta Minghella who was appointed in 2010 but resigned in 2017 to work for the Church Commissioners. She was succeeded by the current chief executive officer Amanda Khozi Mukwashi. The 2012–2013 income of Christian Aid was £95.4 million.

Reconstruction after various wars in Vietnam, Laos and Cambodia were major projects, alongside the aid given after the overthrow of dictators Idi Amin in Uganda, Somoza family in Nicaragua, and Pol Pot in Cambodia.  Yanomami Indians in Brazil were also supported, in a commitment to marginalized peoples.

Fundraising

Christian Aid  raises income from a wide number of sources, such as institutional grants, regular gifts, the Christian Aid Week appeal, general donations, legacies, and emergency appeals.  In 2013, the institutional income, part of which comes from the Department for International Development and the European Commission, constituted 41% of the total income.  A significant percentage of the remaining income comes from thousands of individuals in churches and communities.  The main fundraising moments include Christmas, Harvest, and Christian Aid Week.  In 2013, £12.6 million (or 13% of the total income was raised during this week.  Throughout the year supporters give regularly using direct debit, cash donations, and Will Aid.  Churches and community groups also take part in the annual calendar of events (e.g., walks, soup lunches, and quizzes).

Criticism
The development economist Paul Collier in his book The Bottom Billion suggests that Christian Aid "deeply misinformed" the UK electorate in 2004 and 2005 with a campaign against reducing trade barriers in Africa. He says the campaign was based on a "deeply misleading" study conducted by an economist without the requisite expertise and whose purported review "by a panel of academic experts" was by two people whom the economist had himself chosen and who were also "not noted for their expertise on international trade". He quotes an unnamed official at the British Department of Trade and Industry as saying "they know it's bad, but it sells the T-shirts".

Several of the Britain's leading foreign aid charities, including Christian Aid, British Red Cross, Save the Children, and Oxfam, have been criticized for paying what some alleged to be excessive salaries to some of their managers.  In 2013, Christian Aid's CEO was paid £126,206 and four other staff members were paid between £80,000 and £90,000. Christian Aid's response to this was: "We want to reassure you that we make every effort to avoid paying higher salaries than are necessary. We pay our staff salaries the same as, or below, the median of other church-based and/or international development agencies."

Legal action by Zionist Advocacy Center
In March 2023 Christian Aid commented on a legal action taken against the organisation by the Zionist Advocacy Center. The legal action was commenced in 2017, and was rejected by the US courts in September 2022. The legal action alleged that Christian Aid was "virulently anti-Israel" and had fraudulently obtained funding from the US government. Patrick Watt, the chief executive for Christian Aid, said: "I don’t believe … this case was brought against us in the belief that it had legs. I think it was brought against us in an effort to throw sand in the wheels of our advocacy and to make working on IOPT [Israel and the occupied Palestinian territory] very expensive."

See also
The Climate Coalition
'Trade Justice' campaigns

References

External links
 Christian Aid official web site
 The papers of Christian Aid are held at SOAS Archives

Christian charities based in the United Kingdom
International charities
Organisations based in the London Borough of Lambeth
Religious action on climate change
Religion in the London Borough of Lambeth
1945 establishments in the United Kingdom
Organizations established in 1945